Mason Redman (born 26 August 1997) is a professional Australian rules footballer playing for the Essendon Football Club in the Australian Football League (AFL). He is also known by many nicknames; such as red dog and horse.

Redman grew up in Millicent, South Australia, the son of a lobster fisherman. He played junior football for Millicent in the Western Border Football League, making his debut for the A Grade at 15.  Redman was included in Glenelg's South East talent squads and moved to Adelaide in 2015 to achieve his dream of playing in the AFL. He moved in with his Aunt at Highgate and joined Concordia College so school football wouldn't interfere with his Glenelg commitments.

Redman started 2015 in the under 18s for Glenelg, then played for South Australia in the AFL Under 18 Championships. He then played reserves for Glenelg and two senior South Australian National Football League games.

He was recruited by the Essendon Football Club with pick 30 overall in the 2015 national draft. He made his debut in the eighty-one point loss against the Sydney Swans at the Sydney Cricket Ground in round 7 of the 2016 AFL season.

After becoming a regular running defender in the Essendon side in 2021, Redman became renowned for his booming right foot goals from outside 50m usually followed by his unique "Hellboy" celebration.

References

External links

1997 births
Living people
Essendon Football Club players
Glenelg Football Club players
Australian rules footballers from South Australia